
Gmina Myślibórz is an urban-rural gmina (administrative district) in Myślibórz County, West Pomeranian Voivodeship, in north-western Poland.

Villages
Apart from the town of Myślibórz, Gmina Myślibórz contains the villages and settlements of Bierzwnik, Bucznik, Chełmsko, Chłopówko, Chłopowo, Czeczewo, Czerników, Czółnów, Czyżykowo, Dąbrowa (village), Dąbrowa (settlement in the sołectwo of Rościn), Dalsze, Derczewo, Dzieżgów, Głazów, Golczew, Golenice, Golenicki Młyn, Gryżyno, Grządziele, Iłowo, Janno, Jarużyn, Jezierzyce, Jeziorzyce, Kierzków, Klicko, Kolonia Myśliborzyce, Kostno, Krężel, Krusze, Kruszwin, Ławy, Lichoca, Lipie, Listomie, Mączlino, Mirawno, Myśliborzyce, Nawojczyn, Nawrocko, Niesłusz, Odolanów, Osmolino, Otanów, Pacynowo, Płośno, Pluty, Pniów, Podławie, Podłążek, Prądnik, Przymiarki, Pszczelnik, Renice, Rokicienko, Rościn, Rościnko, Rów, Sądkowo, Sicienko, Sitno, Sobienice, Straszyn, Strzelnik, Sulimierz, Szypuły, Tarnowo, Tchórzynek, Turzyniec, Utonie, Wierzbnica, Wierzbówek, Wrzelewo, Wydmuchy, Zarzecze, Zgnilec and Zgoda.

References
Polish official population figures 2006

Mysliborz
Myślibórz County